Eugnosta namibiana is a species of moth of the family Tortricidae. It is found in Namibia.

References

Endemic fauna of Namibia
Moths described in 2004
Eugnosta